Acrobasis ramosella is a species of snout moth in the genus Acrobasis. It was described by Francis Walker in 1866. It is found in South Africa.

References 

Endemic moths of South Africa
Moths described in 1866
Acrobasis
Insects of South Africa
Moths of Africa